Fyodor Grigoryevich Chernozubov (14 September 1863 – 14 November 1919; sometimes seen as Theodore G. Chernozubov) was a Russian Imperial Army officer who became lieutenant general on 20 February 1915. He was trained at Page Corps and later  Imperial General Staff Academy in 1889.

He became Chief of Staff of the 1st Caucasus Cossack Division (Russian Empire) from 17 April 1901 to 10 December 1902 at the Russian Caucasus Army. He was assigned Chief troops Caucasia on 10 December 1902. Between 30 July 1902 to 1 June 1906, he was the head of the cavalry training of Persian Cossack Brigade. He was appointed Chief of Staff of Terek Cossacks on 26 November 1908. He published several articles on military intelligence.

On 1 April 1915 he was assigned as chief of the 4th Caucasian Cossacks Division at Persian Campaign. From 4 July 1916 he was Commander II Caucasus CAW and showed himself as a talented commander. After the February Revolution he was removed from office during the cleansing of top military staff.

1863 births
1919 deaths
Imperial Russian Army generals
Emigrants from the Russian Empire to Iran
Russian military personnel of World War I
White movement generals